Andronymus gander, the migrant dart, is a butterfly in the family Hesperiidae. It is found in Nigeria, Cameroon, the Republic of the Congo, the eastern part of the Democratic Republic of the Congo, western Uganda and Tanzania (from the north-east to the Usambara Mountains). It is a migratory species.

References

Butterflies described in 1947
Erionotini